Eversley may refer to:

 Eversley, a village in Hampshire, England
 Eversley, Ontario, Canada, a small community in the township of King
 Eversley, a locality east of Ararat, Victoria